Calymene niagarensis is a species of trilobite belonging to the genus Calymene. These nektobenthic carnivores lived in the  Middle Silurian, from 436.0 to 426.2 Ma.

Description
It has around 20 body segments and small, round eyes.

Distribution
Fossils of this species have been found in the Silurian sediments of United States. Most specimens have been found in New York and Oklahoma.

References

 The Fossil Forum

Calymenidae
Paleontology in New York (state)
Paleontology in Oklahoma